The 2015 NorCA Women's Handball Championship was the first edition of the Nor.Ca. Women's Handball Championship, which took place in Salinas, Puerto Rico from 30 March to 5 April 2015. It acted as the North America e Caribbean qualifying tournament for the 2015 Pan American Women's Handball Championship.

Participating teams

Preliminary round
All times are local (UTC−4).

Final round

Fifth place game

Third place game

Final

Final standing

References

External links
Results at todor66

2015 in handball
Nor.Ca Women's Handball Championship
Salinas, Puerto Rico
2015 in Puerto Rican sports
International sports competitions hosted by Puerto Rico
March 2015 sports events in North America